Richey Reneberg (born October 5, 1965) is an American former professional tennis player.

He attended Southern Methodist University, where he was a three-time All-American and reached the 1986 National Collegiate Athletics Association finals.

He was the ATP Newcomer of the Year when he turned professional in 1987.

He and his partner Jim Grabb were ranked world No. 1 in doubles and won the 1992 US Open doubles title. His career-high singles ranking in the ATP Tour was world  No. 20. He won a second doubles Grand Slam title with Jared Palmer, at the 1995 Australian Open.

The right-hander represented the United States at the 1996 Summer Olympics in Atlanta where he was defeated as the 11th seed in the first round by India's Leander Paes. He also played on the American Davis Cup team.

Grand Slam finals

Doubles: 3 (2 titles, 1 runner-up)

Career finals

Singles: 7 (3 wins)

Doubles: 35 (19 wins)

Doubles performance timeline

External links
 
 
 

1965 births
American people of German descent
American male tennis players
Australian Open (tennis) champions
Hopman Cup competitors
Living people
Olympic tennis players of the United States
Sportspeople from Phoenix, Arizona
SMU Mustangs men's tennis players
Tennis people from Arizona
Tennis players at the 1996 Summer Olympics
US Open (tennis) champions
Grand Slam (tennis) champions in men's doubles
ATP number 1 ranked doubles tennis players